Gorilla Glue is an American brand of polyurethane adhesives based in Sharonville, Ohio. They are known for their original Gorilla Glue, which was first sold in 1994. The company has since branched out to make a line of similar products, including tapes, epoxies, and other adhesives. It is known for its unique advertisements, which involve someone breaking something and needing glue. It is usually given to them by a gorilla, surprising them.

History 
In 1994, during a trip to Indonesia, Mark Singer saw a polyurethane glue being used to make teak furniture.  After returning to the US, he founded the company and created the brand name Gorilla Glue. Working with the Danish manufacturer Singer acquired the rights for North America, branded the product and imported it to the US. It was originally marketed towards woodworkers and sold to the general public. The company was purchased by Lutz Tool Company, which later changed its name to The Gorilla Glue Company.

It is privately owned by the Ragland family. In late 2016, the company relocated from its Cincinnati location on Red Bank Road to Sharonville, a suburb of Cincinnati. As of 2019, brothers Pete and Nick Ragland serve as Co-Presidents of the Gorilla Glue Company.

Glue variants 
Original Gorilla Glue works on wood, stone, foam, metal, ceramic, glass and other materials. It expands slightly while drying, sometimes enough to cause squeeze-out, which foams up in air. Super is a fast drying glue. Gel Super is a no-dripping variety.  Gorilla Construction Adhesive is an adhesive used for construction purposes.

Composition

Health hazards 
Gorilla Glue is harmful if inhaled. It is irritating to the eyes, respiratory system, nasal system and skin. If ingested, it may cause gastrointestinal blockage.

Legal Issues

In 2015, the Federal Trade Commission (FTC) took interest as Gorilla Glue claimed that its product was made in USA. The FTC alleged "that certain labels and marketing materials may have overstated the extent to which Gorilla Glue adhesive products are made in the United States", because many of the raw materials were sourced overseas first. Due to Gorilla Glue's stated intent to correct this marketing issue, the FTC decided to not take further action.

Gorilla Glue Co. brought a suit against the Las Vegas-based developer of marijuana strains GG Strains LLC. In October 2017 the companies reached a settlement requiring GG Strains and its licensees to cease using the name Gorilla Glue, any gorilla imagery, and similarities to Gorilla Glue Co. trademarks by September 19, 2018. Following this, GG Strains has renamed their product GG or GG4.

See also 
 Cyanoacrylate
 Gorilla Tape

References

External links 
 

20th-century inventions
Adhesives
Brand name materials
Products introduced in 1994
American brands
Woodworking adhesives